Klein Mier is a small town in the Dawid Kruiper Local Municipality within the ZF Mgcawu District Municipality in the Northern Cape province of South Africa. 449 people reside in the town, 96.88% of whom are Coloured. Afrikaans is spoken by 98.22% of the population.

References

Populated places in the Dawid Kruiper Local Municipality